

Hellmuth Mäder (5 July 1908 – 12 May 1984) was a German general during World War II. He was a recipient of the  Knight's Cross of the Iron Cross with Oak Leaves and Swords of Nazi Germany.

A native of Rotterode, Thuringia, Hellmuth Mäder joined the Army in 1936, and by September 1939 was serving as a junior officer with the 34. Infanterie-Division. In the spring of 1940, Oberleutnant Mäder commanded the 14th Company of the Infanterie-Regiment 522 in the newly formed 297. Infanterie-Division, which was not deployed in the Western campaign. In late 1940 he was appointed commander of III Battalion / Infanterie-Regiment 522, and served in that post during the opening phase of Operation Barbarossa. His division fought under Army Group South, advancing on Kiev and Rostov, and for his gallantry during the defensive action of winter 1941/1942, Mäder was awarded the Knight's Cross of the Iron Cross on April 3, 1942. In July 1942 he was promoted to Major and took command of Infanterie-Regiment 522, which distinguished itself during 6. Armee's drive to the Don, fighting at Kharkiv, the Izyum Pocket and Voronezh.

Promoted to Oberstleutnant, Mäder led his regiment into Stalingrad, where it was cut off with the rest of the 6. Armee. Hellmuth Mäder led battle groups of his regiment and others during the defensive fighting of December 1942 and January 1943. A serious wound led to his evacuation by air before the final collapse of the 6. Armee at Stalingrad.

While recovering from his wounds Mäder was placed on the Führerreserve until early 1944. Promoted to Oberst, he was given command of the Eingreifbrigade Narwa and returned to the northern sector of the Eastern Front. Here he was successful in halting a number of localized Soviet attacks before being severely wounded once more. This time, on recovery from his wounds he was appointed commander of the Heeresgruppen Waffenschule Nord, a weapons training establishment. When the Soviets launched their 1944 summer offensives he returned to the front, having responsibility for organizing the defence of a vital railway junction at Šiauliai, between Königsberg and Riga. He held it open under heavy attack for two days, allowing retreating German units to pass safely through. For this achievement he was awarded the Oak Leaves on August 27, 1944.

That autumn Mäder served briefly as commander of the 7. Panzerdivision, again on the northern Russian front. At the end of 1944 he was given command of the elite Führer Begleit Brigade, a part of Panzerkorps Grossdeutschland. He led it through Ardennes offensive, and when, early 1945, the brigade was expanded to become the Führer Grenadier Division, the promoted Generalmajor Mäder was put in command. The new division saw fighting on the Eastern front near Stettin, before being forced to retreat south-west to the outskirts of Vienna. Here, during the final battles for the Austrian capital, Generalmajor Mäder was awarded the Swords to his Knight's Cross on April 18, 1945.

Although Mäder had surrendered to US forces, he was handed over to the Soviets, who held him in captivity until 1955.

In 1956 Mäder joined the Bundeswehr, serving with the rank of Brigadegeneral and commanded of the Infanterieschule Hammelburg. His last rank before retirement was Generalleutnant. In 1974 he was arrested. convicted and sentenced to two years imprisonment for money he embezzled in his position in the Bundeswehr as well as for inconsistencies in his expense reports. It was an accusation which he denied until he died on May 12, 1984 in Konstanz.

Awards 
 Iron Cross (1939)  2nd Class (27 June 1941) & 1st Class (1 August 1941)
 Knight's Cross of the Iron Cross with Oak Leaves and Swords
 Knight's Cross on 3 April 1942 as Major and commander of the III./Infanterie-Regiment 522
 560th Oak Leaves on 27 August 1944 as Oberst and leader of the Lehr-Brigade Nord/Heeresgruppe Waffenschule Nord and at the same time combat commander of Schaulen
 143rd Swords on 18 April 1945 as Generalmajor and commander of the Führer-Grenadier-Division

References

Citations

Bibliography

 
 
 

1908 births
1984 deaths
People from Schmalkalden-Meiningen
Major generals of the German Army (Wehrmacht)
Bundeswehr generals
Recipients of the Knight's Cross of the Iron Cross with Oak Leaves and Swords
German prisoners of war in World War II held by the Soviet Union
Lieutenant generals of the German Army
Knights Commander of the Order of Merit of the Federal Republic of Germany
Military personnel from Thuringia
German Army generals of World War II